Gower College Swansea is a further education college in Swansea, Wales. It was formed in 2010 by the merger of Gorseinon College and Swansea College. Mark Jones, previously principal of Bridgend College, became principal in July 2013

Campuses 

Gower College provides further education and other training courses from several campuses and venues in the area. The college has five campuses:
 Gorseinon
 Tycoch
 Jubilee Court
 Llwyn y Bryn
 Sketty Hall

Exam results 
In 2021, Gower College reported that the overall A-level pass rate was 99%, above the Welsh national average. Of these passes, 43% were at the higher grades of A* to A, 70% were at A*-B, and 88% were at A*-C.

Governance 
The college is overseen by twenty governors who form the Corporation Board.

Sports academies 
The college has a number of sports academies that enable full-time students to develop skills in football, rugby, netball, hockey and cricket. Sports scholarships are available.

Higher education courses 

The college offers the following higher education courses:

Foundation Degrees

 Analytical and Forensic Science
 Care and Support
 Early Childhood
 IT Management for Business
 Education Learning and Development
 English and History
 Housing and Sustainable Communities
 Sports Development and Management

Higher National Certificates and Diplomas

 HNC and HND in Building Services
 HND in Business and Accountancy
 HND in Computer and Information Systems
 HNC and HND in Electrical/Electronic Engineering
 HND in Electrical Engineering
 HNC and HND in Mechanical Engineering

Other

 Professional Graduate Certificate in Education
 CertEd Post-compulsory Education and Training
 Diploma in Leadership for Children's Care, Learning and Development (Advanced Practice)

College charity 
The Kenya Community Education Project was set up in 2003 and is ran by the college students. This project aims to raise money to maintain a feeding programme for over 120 of the poorest pupils at Madungu Primary School in Kenya. In addition, it aims to pay the salaries of two teachers and supply them with various educational materials. The college holds an annual Kenya Project Day but fundraising continues throughout the year.

Students participate in the annual Cannock Chase Walk to raise funds as well as various events throughout the year. For example, a Walrus Dip.

Members of the project have a chance to go to the Kenyan school every other year.

As of recent years, the college's Islamic Society started up a charity for the Islamic Relief for a week every November. Their most recent charity week had raised £1779.60.

References

Further education colleges in Swansea
2010 establishments in Wales
Educational institutions established in 2010